Seh Konar-e Olya (also Romanized as Seh Konār-e ‘Olyā; also known as Sadd-e Konār-e ‘Olyā, Sadd-e Konār-e Soflá, Sadd Konār, Sad Konār, Seh Kenar, and Seh Konār) is a village in Bandar Charak Rural District, Shibkaveh District, Bandar Lengeh County, Hormozgan Province, Iran. At the 2006 census, its population was 151, in 27 families.

References 

Populated places in Bandar Lengeh County